The Sparda-Banks in Germany are eleven cooperative banks which are consolidated in the Verband der Sparda-Banken e. V. (Union of Sparda-Banks). Traditionally they are specialized in the retail banking business. The eleven, legally independent banks operate according to the regional principle, which means that each bank is responsible for a set business area and only accepts customers from that area.

Development
The oldest Sparda-Bank was founded on 6 May 1896 as Spar- und Vorschuss-Verein der badischen Eisenbahnbeamten (Savings and Imprest Association of the Baden Railroad Officials) in Karlsruhe. Based on this model equal cooperatives were founded in other places, which, in the spring of 1906, consolidated in the Revisionsverband der Eisenbahn-Spar- und Darlehnskassen (Revision Federation of the Railroad Savings and Loan Associations) in Kassel.

In 1969 the railroad savings banks were opened for staff of other public services and in 1974 for all employees (steady income in the salary account is expected). Since 1978 the banks uniformly call themselves Sparda-Banks.

In the center of its business activities is the standardized retail banking. Customers purchase at least one cooperative share (the amount and the maximum of available shares is determined individually by each bank in a statute) and are therefore, together with other customers, members and part owners of the bank. For the cooperative shares an annual dividend is paid (at the Sparda-Bank Süd-West currently 3%, at the Sparda-Bank Baden-Württemberg 3.5%).

Checking account
The Sparda-Banks checking account (excluding Sparda-Bank Berlin since October 1, 2017) is free of charge for members as wage, salary or retirement account. However, since 2015, Sparda-Banks charge annually different amounts for the Bankcard.

Cooperative
The following Sparda-Banks are consolidated in the Verband der Sparda-Banken e. V. (Union of Sparda-Banks) which as auditing association is responsible for the statutory audits according to the cooperative bill:

 Sparda-Bank Augsburg
 Sparda-Bank Baden-Württemberg (in Stuttgart, fusion with Sparda-Bank Karlsruhe)
 Sparda-Bank Berlin
 Sparda-Bank Hamburg
 Sparda-Bank Hannover
 Sparda-Bank Hessen
 Sparda-Bank Munich
 Sparda-Bank Nürnberg
 Sparda-Bank Ost Bayern (in Regensburg)
 Sparda-Bank Südwest
 Sparda-Bank West (fusion of Sparda-Banks in Essen, Wuppertal and Cologne)

Sparda-Banks are members in the National Association of German Cooperative Banks (BVR) and its protection scheme. Sparda-Banks are together with other banks part of CashPool. A few Sparda-Banks have agreements for a free of charge cash withdrawal at Postbank ATMs.

Business figures
In sum the total assets of all Sparda-Banks was 68.9 billion euros in 2016. At the end of 2016 the number of all members of Sparda-Banks was 3.6 million.

References

External links
 Official Website

Banks of Germany
Cooperative banks of Germany
1896 establishments